FC Hämeenlinna is a Finnish football club, based in Hämeenlinna. It currently plays in the Finnish third Division (Kakkonen). The club's manager is Tomi Uusitorppa, and it plays its home matches at Kauriala.

The team was formed in 1991.

Club's history

Initial years

FC Hämeenlinna was founded in autumn 1991, when the town's two football teams HPK and Pallo-Kärpät decided to merge. In the spring of 1992, K-Team took the place of HPK in the Kolmonen. The team were coached by Seppo Pyykkö and Teuvo Palkki.

FC Hämeenlinna in the autumn of 1993 gained promotion to the Kakkonen, where their stay was short-lived, as they gained promotion this time to the Ykkönen. The club played at this level until 1998, when they were relegated back to the Kakkonen. The first team won the Ykkönen Cup in the summer of 1996.

In the autumn of 1998, the club launched a project with the objective of achieving to top-level football for Hämeenlinna. Jari-Pekka Keurulainen was hired as coach, and one of his signings was Ismo Lius. The following season Lius took on additional training responsibilities, and he coached the team during the 2000 season. Then Hannu Touru was hired as coach, and season 2001 ended with celebrations, with the team winning the play-off against in Jaro (from Pietarsaari) by 4–2 on aggregate.

Current squad

Coaches

External links
Official website

Hameenlinna
Hameenlinna
Sport in Hämeenlinna
1991 establishments in Finland